Herring Cove Provincial Park is a provincial park located on Campobello Island, New Brunswick.

External links
Park homepage

Provincial parks of New Brunswick
Geography of Charlotte County, New Brunswick
Tourist attractions in Charlotte County, New Brunswick
Beaches of New Brunswick
Landforms of Charlotte County, New Brunswick